Itu is located in the southeast of Nigeria and is a Local Government Area of Akwa Ibom State. The Local Government Area occupies a landmass of approximately 606.1 0 square kilometers. It is bounded in the North and North-East by Odukpani in Cross River State and Arochukwu in Abia State, in the West by Ibiono Ibom and Ikono Local Government Areas, in the South and southeast by Uyo and Uruan Local Government Areas, respectively.

Towns and Villages in Itu LGA

The following Towns and villages that make up Itu LGA, they are:

Oku,

Obot Etim,

Mbiabo,

Ema Itam,

Ikot Annie,

Ekit Itam,

Obong Itam,

Ekiri Itam,

Mbak Atai,

Ikot Ayan,

Ekim itam

Ikot Andem Itam

Ikot Akpan,

Abong,

Mbiatok Itam,

Mbiaku Itam,

Mmkpeti,

Efe Itam,

Afaga Itam

Akon Itam

Ayadehe,

Ibam,

Adang Itam

Ikot Anyan

Ntiat

Ikot Ukono,

Ikot Ebom Itam;

Ikot Ekang;

Ikot Ekwere Itam;

Ikot Emien Itam;

Ikot Etpuk;

Ikot Mbonde Itam;

Ikot Obio Atai I;

Ikot Obio Enang;

Ikot Obong Edong;

Ikot Abiyak

Mbak Ikot Oku;

Mbak Obio;

Mbribit Itam;

Ntak Inyang;

Nung Ukot Itam;

Nwut Usiong,

Afaha Ube;

Afaha Ude Oke;

Atai Ibiaku Itam;

Ekit-Itom Akpan Obong;

Ikot Abasi Itam;

Ikot Akpabio-Ayadehe;

Ikot Onoi;

Ikot Udo

Mkapna Uruk, and Ika oku.

Economy of the Itu LGA people 
Farming is a major occupation in Itu LGA with various harvests, for example, gmelina, raffia palm, oil palm, and plantain filled nearby. Additionally, a few mineral stores are found in Itu LGA and these incorporate raw petroleum, salt, limestone, and rock. Fishing is also one more basic element of the economy of Itu LGA with the space's numerous waterways being wealthy in fish. Other significant ventures embraced by individuals of Itu LGA incorporate exchange and stumbling.
Itu local government council's Secretariat been  located in Mbak Atai Itam beside at calabar-ltu highway road that linked to cross-rivers state.
17 May 1994-year was inaugurated day Itu L.G.A became established by Military administrator, LT.Col Yakubu Bako.

Notable people
Emem Eduok (born 1994), footballer

References

External links
 Satellite Map of Akwa Ibom State on Google Maps World Gazetteer
 akwaibomnewsonline.com: Akwa Ibom State News from Various News Sources
 ibomvillagesquare.com: Akwa Ibom Village Square Portal
 uncommontransformation.tv: Uncommon Transformation multimedia portal 

States and territories established in 1987
Local Government Areas in Akwa Ibom State